Asan is a city in South Korea.

Asan may also refer to:

Aasaan and Asaan, titles in India
Aşan, Azerbaijan
Asan-Maina, Guam
Asan, Iran (disambiguation)
Asan, Kathmandu, Nepal
Kumaran Asan, Indian poet
Terminalia elliptica, a tree, also known as Asana
ASAN service, service in Azerbaijan
NYSE ticker symbol for Asana, Inc.

See also
Autistic Self Advocacy Network (ASAN)
AddressSanitizer (ASan)